Sandra Uptagrafft (born April 12, 1971 in Singapore) is an American sport shooter. At the 2012 Summer Olympics, she competed in the Women's 10 metre air pistol, and finished in 28th place.  She also competed in the Women's 25 metre pistol event and also finished 28th in that. She has won gold and silver medals in the Pan American Games.

She has qualified to represent the United States at the 2020 Summer Olympics.

Personal life
Uptagrafft graduated from Beverly Hills High School in 1989 and from Troy State University in 1998. She is married to fellow sports shooter Eric Uptagrafft and is based in Phenix City, Alabama.  She is a Staff Sergeant in the US Army Reserves.

References

1971 births
Living people
American female sport shooters
American military Olympians
United States Distinguished Marksman
Olympic shooters of the United States
Shooters at the 2012 Summer Olympics
Shooters at the 2015 Pan American Games
Pan American Games medalists in shooting
Pan American Games silver medalists for the United States
Shooters at the 2011 Pan American Games
Pan American Games gold medalists for the United States
Shooters at the 2007 Pan American Games
Shooters at the 2003 Pan American Games
Shooters at the 2019 Pan American Games
Medalists at the 2007 Pan American Games
Medalists at the 2011 Pan American Games
Medalists at the 2015 Pan American Games
Medalists at the 2019 Pan American Games
Shooters at the 2020 Summer Olympics
United States Army non-commissioned officers
United States Army reservists
21st-century American women
20th-century American women